The 2016 Atlantic Sun men's basketball tournament marked the 37th year the league now known as the ASUN Conference conducted a postseason tournament. The tournament was held March 1–6, 2016 at campus sites as top seeds hosted each round. Florida Gulf Coast won their second Atlantic Sun Tournament title and a berth in the 2016 NCAA tournament.

Seeds
All 8 teams in the conference participated in the Tournament. 

Stetson was ineligible to participate in the NCAA Tournament due to APR violations, but was allowed to participate in the Atlantic Sun Tournament.  Had Stetson won the tournament, North Florida would have gone to the NCAA Tournament because of its regular season Atlantic Sun Conference title. 

Teams were seeded by record within the conference, with a tiebreaker system to seed teams with identical conference records.

Schedule

Bracket

* denotes overtime period

See also
2015–16 NCAA Division I men's basketball season
Atlantic Sun men's basketball tournament

References

External links 
Atlantic Sun Men's Basketball Championship Details

ASUN men's basketball tournament
Tournament
Atlantic Sun men's basketball tournament